Paul Darveniza (born 19 September 1945) was a rugby union player who represented Australia.

Darveniza, a hooker, was born in Brisbane, Queensland and claimed a total of 4 international rugby caps for Australia.

References

Australian rugby union players
Australia international rugby union players
1945 births
Living people
People educated at Cranbrook School, Sydney
Rugby union players from Brisbane
Rugby union hookers